Barnim Nature Park is a nature park and reserve in the state of Brandenburg, and partly in Berlin, Germany. It covers an area of 750 km2 (290 sq mi). It was established on September 24, 1998.

Overview
The park is located between the northern side of Berlin and the central-north Brandenburg, between the towns of Oranienburg, Liebenwalde, Eberswalde and Bernau. Its territory is extended principally in the district of Barnim, and partly in Oberhavel and Märkisch-Oderland. It includes parts of some localities in Berliner districts of Pankow and Reinickendorf; as Buch, Blankenfelde, Karow, Französisch Buchholz, Lübars and Hermsdorf.

Covering 750 square kilometers, 55% is forest, 32% is used for agriculture and 3% is water, including the lake Arkenberger Baggersee. The remainder is settlement and land transport. It is the only natural park in Berlin. In the east there is a glacial valley.

The visitor center of the Barnim Nature Park has been merged with the Agricultural Museum Wandlitz and is situated inside the Barnim Panorama.

References

External links
Official site of the Naturpark Barnim

Nature parks in Brandenburg
Barnim
Oberhavel
Märkisch-Oderland
Parks in Berlin
Pankow
Protected areas established in 1998